Ptychodes is a genus of flat-faced longhorn beetles in the subfamily Lamiinae.

Species
 Ptychodes alboguttatus Bates, 1880
 Ptychodes bifasciatus Dillon & Dillon, 1941
 Ptychodes dilloni Breuning, 1949
 Ptychodes guttulatus Dillon & Dillon, 1941
 Ptychodes mixtus Bates, 1880
 Ptychodes politus Audinet-Serville, 1835
 Ptychodes punctatus Dillon & Dillon, 1941
 Ptychodes taeniotoides Thomson, 1865

References
 

Lamiini